Avan Amaran is a 1958 Indian Tamil language film produced and written by Nagercoil S. Nagarajan, and directed by S. Balachander. The film stars K. R. Ramasamy, P. Kannamba, Rajasulochana and T. S. Balaiah. It was released on 23 May 1958.

Plot

Cast 
The cast is listed below:
K. R. Ramasamy as Arul
 P. Kannamba as Arul's mother
 Rajasulochana as Lily
 T. S. Balaiah as Lily's father

Production 
Avan Amaran was produced and written by Nagercoil S. Nagarajan under People's Films, and directed by S. Balachander shot at the Newtone, Paramount, and Revathi studios in Chennai. The scene where labourers protest on a bridge was shot at a bridge near Fort St. George, Madras (now Chennai). Cinematography was handled by Nemai Ghosh.

Soundtrack 
The soundtrack was composed by T. M. Ibrahim. The lyrics were by A. Maruthakasi, Ku. Sa. Krishnamurthi, Kambadasan, Surabhi, Ku. Ma. Balasubramaniam and Kuyilan. The song "Kaalanaa Minjaadhaiyaa" is based on "Ramayya Vastavayya" from the Hindi film Shree 420 (1955), and "Vaanmadhi Nee Arivaai" is based on "Jaye To Jaye Kahaan" from another Hindi film, Taxi Driver (1954).

Release and reception 
Avan Amaran was released on 23 May 1958. Film historian Randor Guy wrote that the film would be "Remembered for the leftist message-oriented story, screenplay and dialogue, the performances by Ramasami, Kannamba, Balaiah and Rajasulochana, and Balachandar's deft direction." According to him the film did not succeed commercially. At that time as it was left oriented theme there was more than 72 cuts at the Censor board and on appeal it was reduced to 52 and after screening it to the then Prime minister Mr.Jawaharlal Nehru finally 35 cuts were approved and censor board certification was given. In this daragging background the film' s release was delayed by more than 6 months.

When released there was a severe power cut at Tamilnadu, then Madras state, and theaters were allowed to run only one show. This toppled the films success even though it was highly spent movie (₹650,000 production cost) and so it had to become a failure in box office.

Vennai Balachander' s first debut as film Director.

References

Bibliography

External links 
 

1950s Tamil-language films
1958 drama films
1958 films
Films directed by S. Balachander
Films scored by T. M. Ibrahim
Indian drama films